The San Clemente Stakes is a Grade II American Thoroughbred horse race for three-year-old fillies over a distance of one  mile on the turf course scheduled annually in late July or early August at Del Mar Racetrack in Del Mar, California. The event currently carries a purse of $200,000.

History

The event was inaugurated on 17 August 1949 as the San Clemente Handicap as a fillies & mares, three-year-olds and older handicap and was won by the six year old mare Good Breeze who defeated the favourite Honeymoon who was giving 31 pounds to the winner in a time of 1:37.20 for the mile. The following year the event was named the San Clemente Claiming Handicap and was open to all horses three-year-olds and older with an increase in distance to  miles and the event was won by the four year old gelding Vino Fino who took the lead 70 years from the finishing line and won by a length and three quarters.

The event then was idle until 1970 when it was renewed as the San Clemente Stakes on the turf track for three year old fillies only.

The distance was decreased to one mile in 1988 and has been held the same to date.

In 1994 the event was classified as Grade III and was upgraded to Grade II in 1996.

The event has been split into divisions five times with last time occurring in 1990.  The event was run with handicap conditions between 1988 and 2017.
 
The event is considered a major preparatory race for the Grade I Del Mar Oaks which is run later in the Del Mar summer meeting.

Records
Speed record
1 mile: 1:33.54 – Storm Mesa  (2008)
 miles: – 1:42.60 Mint Leaf (1985)

Margins
 6 lengths – Lituya Bay  (1983)

Most wins by a jockey
 5 – Chris McCarron (1984, 1985, 1991, 1994, 1995)

Most wins by a trainer
 4 – A. Thomas Doyle (1975 both divisions, 1976, 1977)
 4 – Robert J. Frankel (1984, 1989, 1996, 2000)
 4 – James M. Cassidy (2003, 2007, 2010, 2015)

Most wins by an owner
 2 – Kaleem Shah (2012, 2021)
 2 – Glen Hill Farm  (1990, 2013)
 2 – Team Valor Stables (1999, 2001)
 2 – Gary Barber (2018, 2020)

 San Clemente Stakes – Del Mar Oaks double
 Go March (1976), French Charmer (1981), Fashionably Late (1984), Flawlessly (1991), Hollywood Wildcat (1993), Famous Digger (1997), Sicy d'Alsace (FR) (1998), Evening Jewel (2010)

Winners

Legend:

 
 

Notes:

§ Ran as an entry

† In the 1975 second division event Mia Amore finished first but was disqualified to second. Princess Papulee was declared the winner.

‡ The 1950 winner Vino Fino was a four-year-old gelding.

¶ The 1949 winner Good Excuse was a six-year-old mare.

See also
List of American and Canadian Graded races

External links
 2020 Del Mar Media Guide

References

Del Mar Racetrack
Horse races in California
Graded stakes races in the United States
Flat horse races for three-year-old fillies
Turf races in the United States
1949 establishments in California
Recurring sporting events established in 1949
Grade 2 stakes races in the United States